Robert J. Thompson (November 30, 1937 – January 28, 2006) was an American politician from Pennsylvania who served as a Republican member of the Pennsylvania State Senate for the 19th district from 1995 to 2006.

Early life
Thompson was born in West Chester, Pennsylvania, to Joseph H. and Winifred Thompson.  He earned a degree in journalism from Penn State University in 1959. He then worked as a photographer for the Philadelphia Evening Bulletin, published in-house magazines for Electric Hose & Rubber Corp. in Wilmington and Lukens Steel Company, and Fidelity Bank. He was the founding director of the Chester County Chamber of Commerce.

Political career
Thompson served on the West Goshen Township Board of Supervisors from 1970 through 1976. In 1979, he was elected to the Chester County, Pennsylvania Board of Commissioners, a position he held until 1986.

State Senate elections
He was first elected to represent the 19th senatorial district in the Pennsylvania Senate in a special election held on November 7, 1995. The special election was triggered by the August resignation of incumbent Republican Earl Baker, with whom Thompson had previously served on the Chester County Board of Commissioners. Thompson defeated Democrat Sara Nichols (along with Libertarian candidate Thomas McGrady, Jr.) by a relatively narrow margin. Thompson's margin of victory was considered stunningly narrow by many political observers.

After filing paperwork to challenge Thompson once again the following year, this time for a full term, Nichols withdrew from the race and moved out of the area. By virtue of her stunningly strong showing in the special election, many observers expected the rematch to be close, but Nichols' withdrawal and move was prompted by her husband's acceptance of a position in the Los Angeles area. Democrats selected Downingtown area native and inventory planner Thomas Bosak as Nichols' replacement on the ballot. Thompson went on to defeat Bosak handily.

Thompson easily won election to a second full term in 2000, once again defeating Bosak by a wide margin. He was re-elected once again in 2004, this time without any Democratic opposition.

Later political career
Thompson was elected Majority Appropriations Chairman by the Senate Republican Caucus in 2001.  In 2003, The Pennsylvania Report named him to "The Pennsylvania Report Power 75" list of influential figures in Pennsylvania politics.

Death
He died on January 28, 2006, from pulmonary fibrosis at the Hospital of the University of Pennsylvania The ensuing special election triggered by his death was won by Democrat Andy Dinniman, who defeated Republican Carol Aichele in a stunning upset, becoming the first Democrat elected to represent Chester County in the state Senate since 1890.

Legacy
In 2012, a section of Pennsylvania Route 3 was named the Robert J. Thompson Highway in his honor.

References

External links
 official PA Senate website (archived)
 official Party website (archived)

1937 births
2006 deaths
20th-century American politicians
21st-century American politicians
American Presbyterians
Deaths from pulmonary fibrosis
Republican Party Pennsylvania state senators
Donald P. Bellisario College of Communications alumni
People from West Chester, Pennsylvania
Chester County Commissioners (Pennsylvania)